Andrew Emil Anderson (July 6, 1945 – June 17, 2019) was an American basketball player.

He played collegiately for Canisius College.

He was selected by the Boston Celtics in the 8th round (88th pick overall) of the 1967 NBA Draft.

He played for the Oakland Oaks (1967–69), Miami Floridians (1969) and Los Angeles Stars (1969–70) in the ABA for 194 games.

Anderson died on June 17, 2019 in Tallahassee, Florida. He was 74 years old.

References

1945 births
2019 deaths
American men's basketball players
Basketball players from Buffalo, New York
Boston Celtics draft picks
Canisius Golden Griffins men's basketball players
Los Angeles Stars players
Miami Floridians players
Oakland Oaks players
People from Cheektowaga, New York
Guards (basketball)